The O'Day 39 is an American sailboat that was designed by Philippe Briand as a cruiser and first built in 1982.

The boat is a development of the Sun Fizz 40, which was licensed for production in the US by Jeanneau. Both Jeanneau and the O'Day Corp. were owned by US conglomerate Bangor Punta at the time.

The O'Day 39 design was developed into the O'Day 40 by C. Raymond Hunt Associates in 1986.

Production
The design was built by O'Day Corp., a division of the Bangor Punta Corp., in the United States. It was built from 1982 until 1985, with 120 boats completed.

Design
The O'Day 39 is a recreational keelboat, built predominantly of fiberglass, with wood trim. It has a masthead sloop rig, a raked stem, a reverse transom, an internally mounted spade-type rudder controlled by a wheel and a fixed fin keel or optional shoal draft keel. The fin keel version displaces  and carries  of ballast, while the shoal draft version displaces .

The boat is fitted with a Universal  diesel engine for docking and maneuvering.

The boat has sleeping accommodation for up to nine people, with a double "V"-berth in the bow cabin, a large "U"-shaped settee around a drop-down table and a straight settee in the main cabin and two aft cabins with a double berths. The galley is located on the port side just forward of the companionway ladder. The galley has a "U"-shape and is equipped with a two-burner stove, an ice box and a double sink. A navigation station is opposite the galley, on the starboard side. There are two heads, one just aft of the bow cabin on the port side and one in the aft cabin, to starboard.

Operational history
A 1982 review in Cruising World noted, "the hull design and deck layout are unmistakenly European, with a low, sleek trunk cabin rising from the foredeck; wide, uncluttered, cambered decks for easy mobility when the boat is heeled; and a tall, double spreader masthead sloop rig."

See also
List of sailing boat types

Related development
Sun Fizz 40

References

Keelboats
1980s sailboat type designs
Sailing yachts
Sailboat type designs by Philippe Briand
Sailboat types built by O'Day Corp.